Plotter Kill may refer to

 Plotter Kill (Mohawk River) – a tributary of the Mohawk River
 Plotter Kill Preserve – a nature preserve in Rotterdam, New York